The Verdun trees are oak and horse chestnut trees planted in the United Kingdom in the aftermath of the First World War.  Acorns and chestnuts were collected from trees on the battlefield at Verdun and sent to England to be distributed and planted as war memorials.  Some were sold by the London and North Western Railway in 1917 to raise money for the War Seal Foundation, founded by Oswald Stoll.  Others may have been brought back to the UK by Field Marshal Lord French.

Queen Mary planted a Verdun oak on the Sandringham Estate in Norfolk on 28 January 1920.  Two Verdun oaks were planted in the Royal Botanic Gardens, Kew on Peace Day, 19 July 1919; one remains, but the other was removed in 2014.

Other Verdun oaks remain in:
 the War Memorial Park, Coventry and in Spencer Park, Coventry
 Queens Park, Crewe, Cheshire (probable)
 Pembridge, Herefordshire
 Southwold, Suffolk;
 Grange Park, Leominster
 Beaumont Park, Huddersfield, where there are two examples
 Corby Castle, Carlisle
 Forbury Gardens, Reading 
 near Hale War Memorial, in Surrey

There are also Verdun horse chestnuts in Beaumont Park, Huddersfield, and one horse chestnut – reportedly from a group of twenty – was planted in St Albans in January 1976.

There are believed to be many other Verdun trees whose locations are not certain, including trees in Walpole Park, Ealing, and in Whitehaven and Swansea.  

Some Verdun trees have been removed, including one at Upton Lawn, Cheshire and one at Moorcourt Estate, Pembridge. An original Verdun oak tree in the Garden of Remembrance, Lichfield was later replaced by a tree grown from one of its acorns.

With the original trees approaching 100 years old, the Woodland Trust launched a project in 2016 to grow a second generation of Verdun trees.

References
 Verdun Oaks: From the smallest of gestures, Woodland Trust
 From little acorns...., Woodland Trust, 11 November 2016 
 WW1 Battle of Verdun oak trees to be grown in Surrey, BBC News, 21 February 2016
 World War One Battle of Verdun oak and chestnut trees traced, BBC News, 14 September 2016
 Verdun Oak, Lichfield, War Memorials Online
 Verdun Oak plaque, Spencer Park, Coventry, War Memorials Online
 Verdun Oak, Leominster, War Memorials Online
 Help The Woodland Trust grow the next generation of Verdun oaks for the next 100 years, Western Front Association, 19 February 2016
 Verdun Oak: Kew Gardens – An Armistice Day Story, Family Affairs and Other Matters 
 Verdun Oak, Kew Gardens, Imperial War Museum
 Verdun Oak, Leominster, Imperial War Museum
 St Albans' Verdun Tree: A Mystery From Our Collections Solved, St Albans Museums, 21 November 2016
 Verdun Acorns, Lichfield Lore, 13 April 2012
 Blurton, Paul (2018). "Queens Park Crewe and the Verdun oaks (and chestnut trees)". L&NWR Society Journal 9: 50–51

Trees of the United Kingdom
World War I memorials in the United Kingdom